Khartoum is the main location for most of Sudan's top educational bodies. There are four main levels of education:
 Kindergarten and day-care. It begins in the age of 3–4, consists of 1-2 grades, (depending on the parents).
 Elementary school. The first grade pupils enter at the age of 6–7. It consists of 8 grades, each year there is more academic efforts and main subjects added plus more school methods improvements. By the 8th grade a student is 13–14 years old ready to take the certificate exams and entering high school.
 Upper second school and high school. At this level the school methods add some main academic subjects such as chemistry, biology, physics, and geography. There are three grades in this level. The students' ages are about 14–15 to 17–18.
 Higher education. There are many universities in Sudan such as the university of Khartoum. Some foreigners attend universities there, as the reputation of the universities are very good and the living expenses are low compared to other countries.

The education system in Sudan went through many changes in the late 1980s and early 1990s.

High schools

 Khartoum Old High Secondary School for Boys
 Khartoum Old High Secondary School for Girls
 The British Educational Schools (BES)
 Khartoum American School, KAS, established in 1957.
 Khartoum International Community School, KICS, established in 2004.
 Unity High School.
 Suliman Hussein Academy
 Comboni and St. Francis, Khartoum new high secondary school for boys
 Khartoum International preparatory school (KIPS)|Khartoum International preparatory school, established in 1928.
 Qabbas Private International Schools
 Kibeida International Schools 
 Riad English School, established 1987
 Nile Valley School, founded 2012
Mohamed Hussein High Secondary School for Boys in Omdurman

Universities and higher institutes in Khartoum

See also 

 Education in Sudan

References

Education in Sudan
Khartoum